Biff Yeager is an American actor. He has appeared in many TV series including Gilmore Girls.

Career 
Yeager has appeared in such TV shows as Star Trek: The Next Generation, The Wonder Years, and Scrubs. He played Lieutenant Commander Argyle in Star Trek: The Next Generation, the gym teacher in Seinfeld, maintenance worker George in Parks and Recreation, Bob in Bunheads and  Tom, local contractor in Gilmore Girls.

His film credits include Black Samurai (1977), Repo Man (1984), Prime Risk (1985), Girls Just Want to Have Fun (1985), Savage Dawn (1985), Sid and Nancy (1986), Straight to Hell (1987), Walker (1987), Banzai Runner (1987), Edward Scissorhands (1990), Another You (1991), Headless Body in Topless Bar (1995), Best Men (1997), Paris (2003) and White Oleander (2002).

References

External links 
 

Living people
Year of birth missing (living people)
American male film actors
American male television actors